is a former Japanese cyclist. He competed in the team pursuit at the 1964 Summer Olympics. From 1967 to 1999 he was a professional keirin cyclist with a total of 11 championships and 356 wins in his career.

References

1945 births
Living people
Japanese male cyclists
Olympic cyclists of Japan
Cyclists at the 1964 Summer Olympics
Place of birth missing (living people)
Keirin cyclists
20th-century Japanese people